Tsarevna Anna Mikhailovna of Russia (14 August 1630 – 27 October 1692) was a Russian Tsarevna, daughter of Tsar Michael of Russia and Eudoxia Streshneva, and the sister of Tsar Aleksei I of Russia. 
	
Anna was presumably named after her father's aunt. There is little information of her life. The Muscovite custom at the time dictated the ideal life of a Russian princess as a cloistered seclusion from the world; as they were not permitted to marry a non-Orthodox nor a partner below their social status, and there were no Orthodox Kingdoms other than Russia at the time, daughters of the tsar were expected never to marry, nor have any contact with men outside of the family during their life. This necessitated a life secluded with an all-female staff in the imperial terem; the tsarevna's attended church and even official state processions covered by screens, and made their pilgrimages to convents in covered sleighs and wagons, as was in fact the custom for all Russian noblewomen at the time. 
Tsarevna Anna's life seem to have answered to this ideal of seclusion. As was required of her, she stayed unmarried. It is known that she was among those accompanying her sister-in-law tsaritsa Maria when the court was evacuated during the Moscow Plague of 1654.

She was known as a supporter of her niece Sofia Alekseyevna of Russia and her reign. In 1689, when Sofia was deposed by tsar Peter the Great, Foy de la Neuville reported that Sofia sent her sister Tsarevna Marfa Alekseyevna of Russia and her aunts Tsarevna Anna Mikhailovna and Tsarevna Tatyana Mikhailovna to mediate.

Anna became a nun at the Ascension Convent a couple of days before her death.

References

 Иконникова А. Царицы и царевны из дома Романовых. М., 1991.

1630 births
1692 deaths
Russian tsarevnas
House of Romanov
Royalty from Moscow
17th-century Russian people